The sunset wrasse (Thalassoma grammaticum) is a species of wrasse native to the eastern Pacific Ocean, where it can be found from Mexico to Peru.

References

External links
 

Sunset wrasse
Fish described in 1890